Karen Maser is an American television writer and producer. She has worked extensively on the NBC medical drama ER and the CBS crime drama Criminal Minds.

Biography

Maser began her television career as a freelance writer. She wrote an episode of Cosby entitled "The Perfect Valentine" in 2000. She wrote an episode for the eleventh season of ER in 2005 entitled "You Are Here". She also contributed an episode to the twelfth season entitled "Out on a Limb".

She was hired as a staff writer for the thirteenth season of ER. As a permanent crew member she wrote two further episodes - "Tell Me No Secrets" and "Photographs and Memories". She returned as a story editor for the fourteenth season. She wrote three episodes personally - "In A Different Light", "Skye's The Limit", and "Truth Will Out". She was promoted to executive story editor part way through the fourteenth season. She joined the production team as a co-producer for the fifteenth and final season. She wrote the episode "Haunted".

In 2015, Maser was hired as a writer and co-executive producer at the start of the eleventh Season of Criminal Minds. She wrote two episodes for the eleventh season ("'Til Death Do Us Part" and "Drive") and she wrote three episodes for the twelfth Season ("Taboo", "Scarecrow" and "Alpha Male").

Filmography

Producer

Writer

Awards/Nominations
Maser won a 2008 Prism Award.

References

External links

American soap opera writers
American television producers
American women television producers
Living people
American women television writers
Place of birth missing (living people)
Year of birth missing (living people)
Women soap opera writers
21st-century American women